Desta Girma Tadesse (born March 27, 1987) is a female long-distance runner from Ethiopia. Her personal best is 2:31:44 achieved at 2013 Mumbai Marathon. In 2013, she also reached her personal best in half marathon, finishing after 1:12:01 in Rome Marathon. Girma has won 2010 and 2011 Madrid Marathon as well as 2011 Riga Marathon.

Achievements

External links

1987 births
Living people
Ethiopian female long-distance runners
Ethiopian female marathon runners
20th-century Ethiopian women
21st-century Ethiopian women